Saparmurat Turkmenbashy Olympic Stadium is a multi-purpose stadium in Ashgabat, Turkmenistan, that stood on the site now occupied by the new Olympic Stadium, built between 2013 and 2017.

Overview
The stadium held 30,000 people and was built in 2003, named for Saparmurat Niyazov. In 2017, it hosted Asian Olympic Council’s Asian Indoor & Martial Arts games that included participation from Australia and wider Oceania. The wider Ashgabat Olympic Park also hosted the 2018 World Weightlifting Championships.

In 2007 the Turkmen government decided to reconstruct the stadium and to enlarge it. The new arena seats up to 45,000 people. The stadium closed in 2012, and was partially demolished in 2013 for redevelopment. The most prominent feature of the new renovations is head of an Ahal-Teke horse, which resembles the national emblem of the country.

Events
The stadium is mostly used for football matches by the Turkmen national football team, but also for musical performances by Turkmen pop stars such as Maral Ibragimova.

The reconstructed stadium was the site of the 5th Asian Indoor and Martial Arts Games, also called the 5th Asian Indoor Games. The opening and closing ceremonies for the games were held on 17 and 27 September 2017.

See also
Ashgabat Stadium

References

External links

New Project

Football venues in Turkmenistan
Sports venues in Ashgabat
Athletics (track and field) venues in Turkmenistan
Turkmenistan
Multi-purpose stadiums in Turkmenistan
Sports venues completed in 2003
2003 establishments in Turkmenistan